Christmasberry (also Christmas berry or Christmas-berry) can refer to any one of several shrubs or small trees, as well as their colorful fruit:

 Ardisia crenata, native to Asia and Australia
 Crossopetalum ilicifolium
 Lycium carolinianum (Carolina desert-thorn, family Solanaceae), a boxthorn native to subtropical North America
 Heteromeles arbutifolia (toyon or California holly, family Rosaceae), native to southern California and northern Mexico
 Passerina ericoides, a South African shrub
 Photinia villosa
 Ruscus aculeatus cultivar 'Christmas Berry'
 Schinus terebinthifolia (Brazilian pepper, family Anacardiaceae), native to South America but introduced and invasive in many tropical and subtropical areas

See also
 Christmas bush